Marsalis Standard Time, Vol. 1 is an album by jazz trumpeter Wynton Marsalis that was released in 1987. It won the Grammy Award for Best Jazz Instrumental Performance, Group in 1988.

Reception
The album reached peak positions of number 153 on the Billboard 200 and number 2 on Billboard's Top Jazz Albums chart. Scott Yanow at AllMusic gave the album four stars and said, "Marsalis' tone is quite beautiful on the well-balanced set; even the ballads have their unpredictable moments." The Penguin Guide to Jazz gave the album three and a half stars and said, "[The album] was wonderfully judged, a programme of pieces that distanced him from the modernists without ever consigning him to the ranks of the Old Believers. Even after more than a decade, Marsalis Standard Time retains its burnish and class."

In Leonard Feather's four-star review, published in The Los Angeles Times shortly after the album's release, any reservations expressed are confined to the album's liner notes.
Marsalis twists the time around on "April in Paris," tries a little tenderness on "Goodbye," turns bassist Bob Hurst loose on "A Foggy Day" and presents his pianist Marcus Roberts, who senses the beauty of the melody on "Memories of You." Except for two Marsalis originals (a personalized blues and a delicate, muted "In the Afterglow") the trumpeter's mature approach to old pop songs is the focus. Incredibly, the verbose notes by Stanley Crouch manage to plow through some 2,000 words without once mentioning George Gershwin, Jerome Kern, Juan Tizol, Ray Noble, Eubie Blake or Hoagy Carmichael. These men merely composed the melodies without which there would have been no standard time.

The album was awarded a Grammy for Best Jazz Instrumental Performance, Group, in 1988.

Track listing

Personnel 
 Wynton Marsalis – trumpet
 Marcus Roberts – piano
 Robert Leslie Hurst III – double bass
 Jeff "Tain" Watts – drums

See also
 Wynton Marsalis discography

References

1987 albums
Columbia Records albums
Wynton Marsalis albums
Grammy Award for Best Jazz Instrumental Album